Quintus Marcius Philippus (Quintus Marcius L. f. Q. n. Philippus) (born c. 229 BC) was a Roman consul in 186 BC and 169 BC.

During his first consulship, he aided his co-consul Spurius Postumius Albinus in the suppression of the Bacchanalia and the drafting of the senatus consultum de Bacchanalibus.

According to the historian Titus Livius he was badly defeated by the Apuan Ligures in a 186 BC battle with Saltus Marcius, fought, probably, in the territory of Seravezza.

He was elected praetor in 188 BC and received Sicily as his purview. He served as an ambassador to Macedonia and the Peloponnese in 183 BC, observing the actions of the Achaean League, and he incited the senate's fears of King Perseus in his report the following year. In 180 BC, Philippus replaced Gaius Servilius Geminus as decemvir sacrorum following Geminus’ death. In 172 BC he led an embassy to Greece to attract support in the growing conflict with Perseus, during which they successfully dismantled the Boeotian League and delayed Perseus’ war on Rome. Philippus was reelected consul in 169 BC and lead the Roman army during the third year of the Third Macedonian War.

In 164 BC Philippus was elected censor with Lucius Aemilius Paullus Macedonicus, during he set up a public sundial in the Rostra next to a previous one by Manius Valerius Maximus Messalla.

References

220s BC births
3rd-century BC Romans
2nd-century BC Roman consuls
2nd-century BC deaths
Year of death uncertain
Quintus
Roman governors of Sicily
Roman censors
2nd-century BC diplomats